Devil Town is an unincorporated community in Wayne County, Ohio, United States. Clear Creek flows through the community.

Land was first sold in the area in 1830.  The community was called "Tannersville" because a tannery was established there.  There was also a blacksmith shop, grocery store, saloon, post office, and mill.

Tannersville later became knows as "Devil Town".  One explanation is that a resident there frequently used the word "Devil" when speaking.  Another explanation is that the residents—seeking relief from the stench of the tannery—were frequently intoxicated and were "real Devils".

Mechanicsburg Road runs through Devil Town, and some homes are located there.  Little remains of the original community.

References

Unincorporated communities in Wayne County, Ohio
Unincorporated communities in Ohio
1830 establishments in Ohio
Populated places established in 1830